Aleksei Andreyevich Mikheyev (born 15 January 1998) is a Russian football player.

Club career
He made his debut in the Russian Professional Football League for FC Sibir-2 Novosibirsk on 21 April 2016 in a game against FC Sakhalin Yuzhno-Sakhalinsk.

He made his Russian Football National League debut for FC Sibir Novosibirsk on 17 April 2017 in a game against FC Dynamo Moscow.

References

External links
 Profile by Russian Professional Football League

1998 births
Sportspeople from Novosibirsk
Living people
Russian footballers
FC Sibir Novosibirsk players
Association football forwards
FC Chita players